Leon Orr (born February 11, 1992) is a former American football defensive tackle. He played college football for the Florida Gators.

Professional career

Oakland Raiders
On May 8, 2015, Oakland Raiders signed Orr as an undrafted free agent. On September 5, 2015, he was waived. On September 7, 2015, he was signed to the practice squad. On December 12, Orr was promoted to the 53-man roster. On August 29, 2016, Orr was released by the Raiders.

Miami Dolphins
On September 20, 2016, Orr was signed to the Dolphins' practice squad. He was promoted to the active roster on October 12. On November 29, Orr was arrested on charges of marijuana possession, possession of a controlled substance, possession of an unregistered firearm, and was released by the Dolphins the following day.

Orlando Apollos
In 2018, Orr signed with the Orlando Apollos of the AAF for the 2019 season. The league ceased operations in April 2019.

Tampa Bay Vipers
Orr was traded to the Tampa Bay Vipers in exchange for defensive tackle Trevon Sanders on December 11, 2019. Orr was released during mini-camp in December 2019.

Los Angeles Wildcats
Orr was drafted in the 6th round during phase three in the 2020 XFL Draft by the Los Angeles Wildcats.

References

External links
 Oakland Raiders bio

1992 births
Living people
American football defensive tackles
Florida Gators football players
Los Angeles Wildcats (XFL) players
Miami Dolphins players
Oakland Raiders players
Orlando Apollos players
People from New Port Richey, Florida
Players of American football from Florida
Sportspeople from the Tampa Bay area
Tampa Bay Vipers players